Zali (also Romanized as Zālī) is a village in Bam Rural District, Bam and Safiabad District, Esfarayen County, North Khorasan Province, Iran. At the 2006 census, its population was 81, in 18 families.

Pre-history and archaeology 
Documented historical name of the village has been called the Nahamod that happens to the Timurid period. His eyebrows in 833 AD. AH of the 12 villages mentioned Arghyan Arghyan pass to the world one of these villages are listed: Rueen village and functions، Ardin village and functions،Dastger village and functions ،Karizdar village،Bekrabad village،Nahamod village،Jahan village and functions ،Ban village and functions ،Sfanj village and functions ،Khargh village and functions.....

Climate Village

Zali Village has a humid climate with hot summers and relatively wet cold winters. Temperatures during the hottest time of year (August and September) are up to 35 C and rainfall is sparse in the May until December, respectively.

Rivers
 The 'Nhajrd Cal' River, with  a catchment area of 62 square kilometers, can be normal for torrential flows to happen. During the river Grdydhast an estimated 5% cubic meters per second can accour. Dashkhaneh, Khoshab also known as Cal.

Aqueducts
Subterranean Dashkhaneh,:
The aqueduct is located in the northern area of the mother Dashkhaneh, Khoshab ancient wells because there is no closure. The Subterranean In the village of village drinking water supply has Nhamvd.
Subterranean zali,:
Zali village 5 km long canal in a ring that embodies it as a canal is the mother in the village wells to 9 feet in some places.

References 

Populated places in Esfarayen County